Lough Lene may be one of the following:

Lough Lene, a limestone fresh water lake dating to pre-Christian, pre-Roman period times.
Lough Leane, another lake in county Kerry, frequently be confused with Lough Lene Westmeath.
Lough Lene Gaels, a local Gaelic athletic association sports club from north Westmeath.
Lough Lene Boat, a unique boat construction of pre-Christian, early Roman times  discovered in Sept. 1968 .